Calvary Cemetery is a Roman Catholic cemetery in Maspeth and Woodside, Queens, in New York City, New York, United States. With about three million burials, it has the largest number of interments of any cemetery in the United States.

Calvary Cemetery is divided into four sections, spread across the neighborhoods of Maspeth and Woodside. The oldest, First Calvary, is also called "Old Calvary."  The Second, Third and Fourth sections are all considered part of "New Calvary."

History

In 1817, the Trustees of Old St. Patrick's Cathedral on Mott Street, Manhattan, realized that their original cemetery on Mulberry Street was almost full. In 1847, faced with cholera epidemics and a shortage of burial grounds in Manhattan, the New York State Legislature passed the Rural Cemetery Act authorizing nonprofit corporations to operate commercial cemeteries. On October 29, 1845 Old St. Patrick's Cathedral trustees had purchased  of land from John McMenoy and John McNolte in Maspeth and this land was used to develop Calvary Cemetery. The cemetery was named after Mount Calvary, where Jesus Christ was crucified according to the New Testament.

The first Calvary Cemetery burial occurred on July 31, 1848. The name of the deceased was Esther Ennis, who reportedly "died of a broken heart." The cemetery was consecrated by Archbishop John Hughes in August 1848. By 1852 there were 50 burials a day, half of them poor Irish under seven years of age. In the early 20th century, influenza and tuberculosis epidemics caused a shortage of gravediggers, and people dug graves for their own loved ones. The entire number of interments from the cemetery's opening in August 1848 until January 1898, was 644,761. From January 1898 until 1907 there were about 200,000 interments, thus yielding roughly 850,000 interments at Calvary Cemetery by 1907.

Calvary was accessible by ferryboats crossing the East River from 23rd Street in Manhattan. It cost an adult seven dollars to be buried there. Burial of children under age seven cost three dollars; children aged seven to fourteen cost five dollars. As development in Manhattan's East Village expanded, bodies buried in that neighborhood were transferred to Queens. In 1854, ferry service opened by 10th Street and the East River.

The original division of the cemetery, now known as First Calvary or Old Calvary, was filled by 1867. The Archdiocese of New York expanded the area of the cemetery, adding more sections, and by the 1990s there were nearly 3 million burials in Calvary Cemetery. The Cemetery continues to add plots and burial spaces can be purchased in advance.

In 1949, several hundred workers at the cemetery went on strike.

Description 
Calvary is split into four sections. The first section is known as First Calvary or Old Calvary, and is located to the west of the section of the Brooklyn–Queens Expressway (I-278) that runs between the Long Island Expressway (I-495) interchange and Newtown Creek. The others are known collectively as New Calvary, and as a group to the east of the above-mentioned section of the Brooklyn–Queens Expressway.

 First Calvary Cemetery is bounded by the Brooklyn–Queens Expressway, Review Ave and 37th Street.
 Second Calvary Cemetery is in-between the Long Island and Brooklyn–Queens Expressways, and also bounded by 48th Street and 58th Street. The cemetery's offices are located here, at 49–02 Laurel Hill Boulevard.
 Third Calvary Cemetery is north of the Brooklyn–Queens Expressway, and also bounded by Queens Boulevard, 49th Street and 58th Street.
 Fourth Calvary Cemetery is south of the Long Island Expressway, and also bounded by 55th Avenue, 50th Street and 58th Street.

The chapel was designed by Raymond F. Almirall. Originally a frame structure, it was rebuilt using limestone in 1908.

Cavalry Veterans Park
The Old Cavalry section of the cemetery is a city-owned public park that serves as a burial ground, the Calvary Veterans Park.

Calvary Monument

The Calvary Monument, erected in 1866, originally with bronze sculptures is located in the park. It is by Daniel Draddy, one of the Draddy Brothers, who sculpted the obelisk to William James MacNeven. There is no signage from either entrance, nor any mention on the official web site's maps. The monument was last renovated in 1929. A conservation effort was initiated in 2009, but  is not done. 

The monument honors the 69th Regiment.

Notable burials

Entertainers
 Nancy Carroll (1903–1965), actress 
 Ferruccio Corradetti (1867–1939), opera singer,
 Dom DeLuise (1933–2009), actor 
 Tess Gardella (1894–1950), actress who played Aunt Jemima 
 Patrick Gilmore (1829–1882), "Father of the American Band" 
 Texas Guinan (1884–1933), actress and saloon-keeper
 Robert Harron (1893–1920), actor – "Second Calvary"
 James Hayden (1953–1983), actor
 Joseph E. Howard (1878–1961), American composer ("Emerson and Howard")
 Patsy Kelly (1910–1981), actress
 James Murray (1901–1936), actor 
 Nita Naldi (1894–1961), actress 
 Arthur O'Connell (1908–1981), actor
 Una O'Connor (1880–1959), actress 
 Edward Le Roy Rice (1871–1938), producer of minstrel shows
 William J. Scanlan (1856–1898), singer
 Wini Shaw (1907–1982), actress 
 Tony Sirico (1942–2022), actor
 Joe Spinell (1936–1989), actor 
 Bert Wheeler (1895–1968), comedian

Law enforcement professionals
 Irma Lozada (1959–1984) a.k.a. "Fran," was a member of the New York City Transit Police who was slain in 1984, becoming the first female police officer to die in the line of duty in New York City.
 Joseph Petrosino (1860–1909), NYPD's first commanding officer of the "Black Hand Squad" (aka Italian Squad), a precursor to the NYPD's Bomb Squad, who investigated the Italian Mafia who used explosives to shake down businesses in NYC. Detective Lieutenant Petrosino, an Italian-American, was the first NYPD officer killed overseas in the "line of duty," while investigating organized crime in Italy. Subject of the film Pay or Die 
 Mary A. Sullivan (1878/1879–1950), first woman in NYPD to be a homicide detective, lieutenant and first grade detective. Founded the Policewoman's Endowment Association.

Military figures
 Edward Brown, Jr. (1841–1911), American Civil War Medal of Honor recipient
 Thomas Burke (1842–1902), American Civil War Medal of Honor recipient
 Richard Byrnes (1833–1864), American Civil War officer and commander of the Irish Brigade 
 Dennis Conlan (1838–1870), American Civil War Medal of Honor recipient
 William C. Connor (1832–1912), American Civil War Medal of Honor recipient
 Michael Corcoran (1827–1863), American Civil War officer and commander of the 69th New York Irish Volunteers
 Thomas E. Corcoran (1838–1904), American Civil War Medal of Honor recipient
 William J. Creelman (1874–1928), Peacetime Medal of Honor recipient
 Cornelius Cronin (1838–1912), American Civil War Medal of Honor recipient
 Michael Doheny (1805–1863), Irish barrister, Young Irelander rebel leader, Fenian organizer and writer
 John Donnelly (1839–1895), American Civil War Medal of Honor recipient
 Patrick H. Doody (1840–1924), American Civil War Medal of Honor recipient
 George W. Ford (1844–1883), American Civil War Medal of Honor recipient
 Patrick Ginley (1822–1917), American Civil War Medal of Honor recipient
 Francis J. Herron (1837–1902), American Civil War general and Medal of Honor recipient 
 Patrick Kelly (d. 1864), American Civil War officer and commander of the Irish Brigade
 Samuel W. Kinnaird (1843–1923), American Civil War Medal of Honor recipient
 Franz Kramer (1865–1924), Spanish–American War Medal of Honor recipient
 William McNamara (1835–1912), American Indian Wars Medal of Honor recipient
 James H. Morgan (1840–1877), American Civil War Medal of Honor recipient
 Charles J. Murphy (1832–1921), American Civil War Medal of Honor recipient
 John McLeod Murphy (1827–1871), American Civil War Army and Navy officer, and State Senator
 Thomas P. Noonan, Jr. (1943–1969) Vietnam War Medal of Honor recipient
 John Francis O'Sullivan (1850–1907), American Indian Wars Medal of Honor recipient
 James Quinlan (1833–1906), American Civil War Medal of Honor recipient
 Eliakim P. Scammon (1816–1894), American Civil War brigadier general
 Robert Augustus Sweeney (1853–1890), two-time Medal of Honor recipient
 Henry A. Thompson (1841–1889), American Civil War Medal of Honor recipient
 Hermann Ziegner (1864–1898), American Indian Wars Medal of Honor recipient

Organized crime figures
 Vito Bonventre (1875–1930), mobster
 Anthony Carfano (1898–1959), mobster aka "Little Augie Pisano"
 John "Johnny" Dolan (c. 1850–1876), executed for the murder of merchant James H. Noe; described (possibly inaccurately) as "Dandy" Johnny Dolan and the head of the Whyos street gang by Herbert Asbury in his book The Gangs of New York
 Natale "Joe Diamond" Evola (1907–1973)
 Stefano "Steve" Ferrigno (1900–1930)
 Joseph Lanza (1904–1968), racketeer; mobster
 Thomas Lucchese (1899–1967), mobster
 Ignatius "Lupo the Wolf" Lupo (1877–1947)
 Joe Masseria (1879–1931) – 1st Calvary
 Peter "Giuseppe" Morello (also known as the Clutch Hand) (1870–1930), the first head of the Morello crime family; now lies in a bare, forgotten grave
 Dominick "Sonny Black" Napolitano (1930–1981), mobster
 Bonaventura "Joseph" Pinzolo (1887–1930)
 Benjamin "Lefty" Ruggiero (1926–1994)
 Paul Kelly (criminal) (1876–1936), mobster 
 Michael "Mickey" Spillane (1934–1977), mobster
 Ciro "the Artichoke King" Terranova (1888–1938)
 Nicolo Terranova (1890–1916)
 Vincenzo "Vincent" Terranova (1886–1922)

Politicians
 Vincent H. Auleta (1886–1961), lawyer, assemblyman
 Stephen J. Colahan (1841–1874), lawyer, assemblyman
 Lawrence V. Cullen, J.D., USMC (1948–2012), Justice New York State Court of Claims (appointed by Gov. George Pataki), elected New York State Supreme Court, 11th Judicial District – 1st (Old Calvary – St. Callixtus)
 Carmine DeSapio (1908–2004), last head of the Tammany Hall political machine 
 Daniel Direnzo (1886–1933), Assistant District Attorney of New York City, Head of Court of Special Sessions
 Thomas J. Dunn (1849–1905), Sheriff of New York County (1897–1899)
 John Fox (1835–1914), U.S. Representative from New York and member of the New York City Council
 Patrick Jerome "Battle-Axe" Gleason (1844–1901) last mayor of Long Island City
 Hugh J. Grant (1857–1910), mayor of New York City
 Martin J. Kennedy (1892–1955) U.S. Representative in Congress (1930–1945) and New York State Senator (1924–1930)
 Thomas A. Ledwith, (1840–1898) New York State Assemblyman and State Senator
 Charles Francis Murphy (1858–1924), head of New York City's Tammany Hall
 Charles Novello (1886–1935), lawyer, assemblyman, alderman
 George Washington Plunkitt (1842–1924), Tammany Hall politician – unmarked grave
 Jere F. Ryan (1882–1948), member of the New York State Assembly and Commissioner of Public Markets
 Alfred E. Smith (1873–1944), Governor of New York State and 1928 U.S. presidential candidate
 Timothy Sullivan (1862–1913), U.S. Representative in Congress (1903–1906; 1912), long-term member of New York State Legislature and sponsor of the Sullivan Act
 Thomas F. Denney (1874–1913), member of the New York State Assembly
 Robert Ferdinand Wagner (1877–1953), U.S. Senator from New York State 
 Robert F. Wagner, Jr. (1910–1991), Mayor of New York City 
 Robert Wagner III (1944–1993), president of the New York City Board of Education, son of Mayor Robert Wagner, Jr., and grandson of Senator Robert Wagner

Sportspeople
 Willie Keeler (1872–1923), Hall of Fame baseball player 
 Phil O'Sullivan (1895–1952), Gaelic footballer
 Jim Shanley (1854–1904), baseball player
 Martin Sheridan (1881–1918), four-time Olympic gold medalist in the discus and shot put
 Mickey Welch (1859–1941), Hall of Fame baseball player

Writers
 Mary Letitia Martin (1815–1850), heiress, novelist
 Claude McKay (1890–1948), poet, journalist, novelist

Others
 James W. Blake (1862–1935), part-time song lyricist who wrote the words to The Sidewalks of New York
 Steve Brodie (1863–1901), Brooklyn bookmaker, claimed to survive Brooklyn Bridge jump 
 William R. Cosentini (1911–1954), mechanical engineer and founder of Cosentini Associates
 Luigi Fugazy (1837–1930), Italian American banker and businessman
 Julia Grant (1873–1944), philanthropist
 Philip Martiny (1858–1927), sculptor
 Edward McGlynn (1837–1900), reformist Catholic priest
 Adolfo Müller-Ury (1862–1947), portrait artist 
 Annie Moore Schayer (1874–1924), first person to be processed through Ellis Island 
 Eugenie Baclini (1909–1912), second R.M.S. Titanic survivor to die after the sinking – solitary, unmarked grave
 S. Joseph Barry, (1933–2019), Professor Emeritus of Audiology and Speech, Section 1W
 Anna Frances Levins (1876–1941), Irish American photographer, publisher, activist
 Etienne Aigner, (1904–2000),  Érsekújvár, Austria-Hungary born designer of handbags and leather goods

See also
 List of United States cemeteries

References

External links
 
 
 
 
 

Roman Catholic Archdiocese of New York
Roman Catholic cemeteries in New York (state)
Cemeteries in Queens, New York
Woodside, Queens
1848 establishments in New York (state)
Maspeth, Queens